Live at the Palladium is the second live album by the American popular music duo The Carpenters. It was recorded during a week of live concerts at the London Palladium in November 1976. No singles were released from the album, although it reached number 28 on the UK Albums Chart. On the cover of the record, Karen is wearing the same dress as in The Carpenters' Very First Television Special. The album was remastered and reissued in the 1980s on the budget Pickwick music label and went Gold in the UK. This album was not released in the U.S. but was widely available as an import.

Track listing

Personnel

Musicians
Karen Carpenter – drums, percussion, vocals
Richard Carpenter – keyboards, vocals
Bob Messenger – bass, keyboards, tenor saxophone, flute
Cubby O'Brien – drums
Doug Strawn – keyboards, clarinet, vocals
Tony Peluso – guitar, keyboards, bass
Dan Woodhams – bass, vocals
Dick Palombi – orchestra conductor

Production
Richard Carpenter – producer, arranger, orchestrations
Karen Carpenter – associate producer
Frank Owen – engineer
Jon Kelly – engineer
Malcolm Davies – engineer
Ray Gerhardt – engineer
Jerry Weintraub – management

Design
Roland Young – art director
Chuck Beeson – art designer

References

The Carpenters albums
1976 live albums
A&M Records live albums
Albums recorded at the London Palladium